The Spartacist League is the name of several Trotskyist groups, which are sections of the International Communist League (Fourth Internationalist):

 Spartacist League (US)
 Spartacist League of Britain
 Spartacist League of Australia
 Spartacist League of Sweden
 Spartacist League of Israel
 Spartacist League/Lanka

Spartacus League is the name of: 
 The original Spartacus League (Spartakusbund, 1914–1919), a communist organisation in post-World War I Germany well known for its ties to the revolutionary Rosa Luxemburg.
 Spartacus League of Left Communist Organisations (Spartakusbund linkskommunistischer Organisationen, 1926–1927), a league of left communist organisations in Germany.
 Spartacus League (1974) (Spartacusbund, 1974–1981/82), a Trotskyist group in Germany.
 Spartacus League UK, (1970-1972) a youth group linked with the International Marxist Group

Political party disambiguation pages